Álvarez de Paz (1560 – 17 January 1620) was a Spanish Jesuit mystic of the Society of Jesus, born at Toledo.

He joined the Society in 1578, and taught theology and philosophy at Lima. Occasionally during his sermons, he fell into ecstasy and had to be carried from the pulpit. The fame of his sanctity was so great in South America, that, when he arrived, in a dying condition, at Potosi, the whole city came out to receive his blessing.

On the day of his death at Potosi, 100,000 men in the silver mines stopped work to assist at his funeral.

Works
 (1608);
 1613;
 1611.

References

1560 births
1620 deaths
People from Toledo, Spain
Spanish Roman Catholic missionaries
Roman Catholic missionaries in Peru
16th-century Spanish Jesuits
17th-century Spanish Jesuits
Jesuit missionaries in Peru